Herefoss may refer to:

Places
Herefoss, a village in Birkenes municipality in Aust-Agder county, Norway
Herefoss (municipality), a municipality that existed from 1838 until 1967 in Aust-Agder county, Norway
Herefoss Church, a church in Birkenes municipality in Aust-Agder county, Norway
Herefoss Station, a former station along the Sørlandsbanen railway line in Birkenes municipality in Aust-Agder county, Norway
Søre Herefoss (literally: south Herefoss), a village in Birkenes municipality in Aust-Agder county, Norway

See also
Herefossfjorden, a lake in Birkenes, Norway